Kirk Talley (born November 14, 1959) is an American football coach. He is the former head football coach at Warner University in Lake Wales, Florida. Talley served as the head football coach at the University of Northwestern – St. Paul in Roseville, Minnesota from 2001 to 2016. He has the distinction of being the head coach at four different Upper Midwest Athletic Conference (UMAC) institutions: Mount Senario College, Greenville University, Crown College in St. Bonifacius, Minnesota, and at the University of Northwestern – St. Paul. 

Talley played college football at Pacific Lutheran University under College Hall of Fame member and head coach Frosty Westering and obtained his master's degree from Miami University. He is married to Terri (Frawley) and has two daughters, Brittni and Kristine, and four grandchildren.

Head coaching record

References

External links
 Warner profile
 Northwestern profile

1959 births
Living people
Bethel Royals football coaches
Crown Storm football coaches
Golden Valley Lutheran Royals football players
Greenville Panthers football coaches
Miami RedHawks football coaches
Mount Senario Fighting Saints football coaches
Northwestern Eagles football coaches
Oklahoma Panhandle State Aggies football coaches
Pacific Lutheran Lutes football players
Taylor Trojans football coaches
Warner Royals football coaches
Junior college football coaches in the United States
Miami University alumni
Sportspeople from Pittsburgh
Players of American football from Pittsburgh